Chirona hameri is a species of acorn barnacle in the family Balanidae.

References

External links

 

Sessilia

Crustaceans described in 1767